Charles Wolcott Ryder Jr. (November 20, 1920 – March 28, 2010) was a United States Army major general who served from 1942 through to 1977.

Ryder graduated from the United States Military Academy, class of 1942, during World War II. Served with the 90th Infantry Division in Western Europe. Graduated from the Command and General Staff College in 1953. Assigned to the Office of the Chief of Staff 1960–61. Commanding Officer 1st Brigade, 8th Infantry Division 1964–66. Commanding General, 199th Infantry Brigade, November 28, 1966 to March 1, 1967. Professor of Military Science, The Citadel, 1966–67. Aerospace Defense Command 4th Infantry Division Republic of Vietnam, 1967–68. Chief of Staff Fourth United States Army 1970–72. Chief, Joint United States Military Aid Group to Greece, Greece 1972–74, Director Logistics and Security Assistance (J-4/7) United States European Command, 1974–77.

His father, Charles Wolcott Ryder Sr., was a United States Military Academy class graduate of 1915 who served in both World War I and World War II, where he commanded  the 34th Infantry Division during the Italian Campaign, before retiring as a major general.

Ryder retired from the U.S. Army in 1977. He died on March 28, 2010.

External links
 Augusta Military Academy Alumni Association Website
 Brigade Officers Roster 199th Brigade
 Hall of Valor awards

1920 births
2010 deaths
United States Army personnel of World War II
United States Army personnel of the Vietnam War
United States Army generals
United States Army Command and General Staff College alumni
Recipients of the Air Medal
Recipients of the Silver Star
Recipients of the Distinguished Flying Cross (United States)
Recipients of the Legion of Merit
The Citadel, The Military College of South Carolina faculty